Sis Paulsen (born July 25, 1980) is an American ice hockey and softball coach. She is the director of hockey operations and equipment manager for the Wisconsin Badgers women's ice hockey team and the equipment manager for the United States women's national ice hockey team.

Playing career
Paulsen attended the University of Wisconsin-Madison and played for the Wisconsin Badgers women's ice hockey team from 1999-2003. She was a captain of the team for three years. In her four years with the Wisconsin Badgers, she had 130 points, a program record by a defenseman. She received her degree in human development and family studies.

Coaching career
After her playing career, Paulsen served as an assistant coach with the Bemidji State Beavers women's ice hockey team for three seasons. While there, she also served in the head coaching position of the Beavers softball team. Later, she became an assistant coach with the Minnesota State Mavericks women's ice hockey team before being given a head coaching position at New England College from 2009 to 2013. She was an assistant coach for the New York Riveters during the 2016-2017 season. She was also the director of girl's hockey for the New Jersey Colonials in Morristown, New Jersey. 
Currently, she is the director of hockey operations and equipment manager for the Wisconsin Badgers women's ice hockey team. She is also the equipment manager for the United States women's national ice hockey team at the 2022 Winter Olympics in Beijing.

References

American women's ice hockey players
Sportspeople from Eau Claire, Wisconsin
Ice hockey coaches from Wisconsin
Living people
University of Wisconsin–Madison alumni
Wisconsin Badgers women's ice hockey players
New England College Pilgrims women's ice hockey
Female sports coaches
Ice hockey players from Wisconsin
1980 births
New England College people